Lahiji (also Romanized as Lāhījī; also known as Lāhejī) is a village in Band-e Amir Rural District, Zarqan District, Shiraz County, Fars Province, Iran. At the 2006 census, its population was 244, in 64 families.

References 

Populated places in Zarqan County